The River of Three Junks (French: La rivière des trois jonques) is a 1957 French thriller film directed by André Pergament and starring Dominique Wilms, Lise Bourdin and Jean Gaven. It is set in Vietnam. It was remade in 1965 under the tile Red Dragon.

The film's sets were designed by the art director Daniel Guéret.

Cast
 Dominique Wilms as Monique 
 Lise Bourdin as Princess Tchéliabruskoi 
 Jean Gaven as Capitaine Brichet 
 Howard Vernon as Igor Kourguine 
 Alain Bouvette as Kerganec 
 Robert Dalban as Capitaine Campion / Secret Service chief 
 Paul Bisciglia as Le chauffeur de taxi / Driver

References

Bibliography 
 Goble, Alan. The Complete Index to Literary Sources in Film. Walter de Gruyter, 1999.

External links 
 

1957 films
1950s thriller films
French thriller films
1950s French-language films
Films directed by André Pergament
1950s French films